Mayele Malango (born 25 February 1997) is a Congolese professional footballer who currently plays for Chattanooga Red Wolves in the USL League One.

Career

Boston Bolts
Malango played with USL League Two side Boston Bolts in 2018 and 2019.

New England Revolution II
Malango joined USL League One side New England Revolution II in January 2020. Malango's contract option was declined by New England on November 30, 2020.

New Amsterdam
In March 2021, Malango joined National Independent Soccer Association side New Amsterdam FC.

Albion San Diego
On March 29th, 2022 Albion San Diego announced that they signed Malango for their 2022 NISA campaign.

Personal
Malango was born in the Democratic Republic of the Congo, but later he and his family were forced to flee to Malawi during a civil war.

References

External links
Mayele Malango at UMass Lowell Athletics

1997 births
Living people
Democratic Republic of the Congo footballers
Democratic Republic of the Congo expatriate footballers
UMass Lowell River Hawks men's soccer players
Boston Bolts players
New England Revolution II players
New Amsterdam FC players
USL League One players
USL League Two players
National Independent Soccer Association players
Association football forwards
Soccer players from Massachusetts
Salem State Vikings
Expatriate soccer players in the United States
Democratic Republic of the Congo expatriate sportspeople in the United States
21st-century Democratic Republic of the Congo people
Chattanooga Red Wolves SC players